Mary Ayuma-Kochwa (23 October 1966 – 2014) was a Kenyan volleyball player. She was part of the Kenya women's national volleyball team.

She participated at the 1998 FIVB Volleyball Women's World Championship in Japan, and at the 2003 All Africa Women's Volleyball Championship.
She competed with the national team at the 2000 Summer Olympics in Sydney, Australia, finishing 11th.

See also
 Kenya at the 2000 Summer Olympics

References

External links
 

1966 births
2014 deaths
Kenyan women's volleyball players
Volleyball players at the 2000 Summer Olympics
Olympic volleyball players of Kenya